The Baizhiyan mine is a large iron mine located in northern China in the Inner Mongolia. Baizhiyan represents one of the largest iron ore reserves in China and in the world having estimated reserves of 179.7 million tonnes of ore grading 33.3% iron metal.

References 

Iron mines in China